Texas's 31st congressional district of the United States House of Representatives covers a strip of Central Texas from the northern Austin suburbs up to Temple and Gatesville.

The district is centered around Bell and Williamson Counties, two fast-growing suburban counties north of Austin; it includes the Williamson County portion of Austin itself. It also includes much of the area surrounding Fort Hood, giving the district a strong military presence, as well as four rural counties to the north and west of the district.

John Carter has served as the representative from this district since its creation. The 31st district is one of only two districts in Texas (the other being the 36th district) that has never been represented by a member of the Democratic Party.

Election results from statewide races

List of representatives

Recent election results

Historical district boundaries

See also
List of United States congressional districts

References

External links
 Congressional Biographical Directory of the United States 1774–present

31
Constituencies established in 2003
2003 establishments in Texas